Catherine Huafei Yan is a professor of mathematics at Texas A&M University interested in algebraic combinatorics.

Education and career
Yan earned a bachelor's degree from Peking University in 1993.
She was a student of Gian-Carlo Rota at the Massachusetts Institute of Technology, where she earned her Ph.D. in 1997 with a dissertation on The Theory of Commuting Boolean Algebras.

After working for two years as a Courant Instructor at New York University, she joined Texas A&M in 1999, with a three-year hiatus as Chern Professor at the Center of Combinatorics, Nankai University, from 2005 to 2008.

Book
With her advisor and Joseph Kung, she is an author of Combinatorics: The Rota Way (Cambridge University Press, 2009). The book provides an exposition of the areas of combinatorics of interest to Rota, unified through an algebraic framework, and lists many open research problems in this area.

Recognition
Yan won a Sloan Research Fellowship in 2001.
She was elected to the 2018 class of fellows of the American Mathematical Society "for contributions to combinatorics and discrete geometry".

References

External links
Home page

Year of birth missing (living people)
Living people
21st-century American mathematicians
Chinese women mathematicians
Combinatorialists
International Mathematical Olympiad participants
High School Affiliated to Renmin University of China alumni
Peking University alumni
Massachusetts Institute of Technology School of Science alumni
New York University faculty
Texas A&M University faculty
Academic staff of Nankai University
Sloan Research Fellows
Fellows of the American Mathematical Society
Place of birth missing (living people)
Nationality missing
21st-century women mathematicians